The 1961 Auburn Tigers football team represented Auburn University in the 1961 NCAA University Division football season. It was the Tigers' 70th overall and 28th season as a member of the Southeastern Conference (SEC). The team was led by head coach Ralph "Shug" Jordan, in his 11th year, and played their home games at Cliff Hare Stadium in Auburn and Legion Field in Birmingham, Alabama. They finished with a record of six wins and four losses (6–4 overall, 3–4 in the SEC).

Schedule

References

Auburn
Auburn Tigers football seasons
Auburn Tigers football